Come-to-Good is a small settlement in Cornwall, England, United Kingdom.

It consists of a farm, seven residential houses and a Quaker Meeting House, built in 1710. It lies on the Tregye Road between Carnon Downs and King Harry Ferry. The boundary between Feock parish to the south and Kea parish to the north runs along the Tregye Road, south of the Meeting House and its burial ground and curves northward to the west, along the path of the stream and to the east, along the track to Penelewey. The Tregye Campus of Truro College is nearby.

The name
Patricia Griffith says "There has been much discussion about the origins of such a delightful name and for some time it was thought it derived from the supposed Cornish Cwm-ty-coit meaning "the coombe by the dwelling in the wood". However this derivation has never been felt to be totally satisfactory and recent research by Dr Oliver Padel has discovered that the name "Come to Good" is not found as a name for the area until fairly late in the seventeenth century, after the arrival of the meeting. He now argues that it is much more likely to be an ironical reference to Friends and the Meeting."

The Quaker Meeting House

References

Hamlets in Cornwall